Mardasavas (Merkinė) is a village in Varėna district municipality, in Alytus County, in southeastern Lithuania.

Demographics 
According to the 2001 census, the village has a population of 34 people.

References

Villages in Alytus County
Varėna District Municipality